NGC 5582 is an elliptical galaxy in the constellation Boötes. It was discovered by William Herschel on April 29, 1788.

References

External links 
 

Boötes
5582
Elliptical galaxies